Rangiriri is a rural community in the Waikato District and Waikato region of New Zealand's North Island. It is located on the Waikato River near Lake Waikare in the Waikato District. State Highway 1 now bypasses Rangiriri.

Rangiriri was the site of a major Māori defence structure during the time of the Invasion of the Waikato, the major campaign of the New Zealand Wars. The Battle of Rangiriri, which took place on 20–21 November 1863, cost both sides more than any other engagement of the land wars and also resulted in the capture of 183 Māori prisoners, which impacted on their subsequent ability to oppose the far bigger British force.

Demographics
The SA1 area is part of the larger Rangiriri statistical area.

The SA1 area had a population of 141 at the 2018 New Zealand census, an increase of 15 people (11.9%) since the 2013 census, and an increase of 15 people (11.9%) since the 2006 census. There were 42 households, comprising 78 males and 63 females, giving a sex ratio of 1.24 males per female. The median age was 38.3 years (compared with 37.4 years nationally), with 30 people (21.3%) aged under 15 years, 33 (23.4%) aged 15 to 29, 60 (42.6%) aged 30 to 64, and 18 (12.8%) aged 65 or older.

Ethnicities were 72.3% European/Pākehā, 31.9% Māori, 6.4% Pacific peoples, 6.4% Asian, and 8.5% other ethnicities. People may identify with more than one ethnicity.

Although some people chose not to answer the census's question about religious affiliation, 48.9% had no religion, 34.0% were Christian, 2.1% had Māori religious beliefs, and 6.4% were Muslim.

Of those at least 15 years old, 18 (16.2%) people had a bachelor's or higher degree, and 18 (16.2%) people had no formal qualifications. The median income was $28,500, compared with $31,800 nationally. 18 people (16.2%) earned over $70,000 compared to 17.2% nationally. The employment status of those at least 15 was that 63 (56.8%) people were employed full-time, 15 (13.5%) were part-time, and 3 (2.7%) were unemployed.

Rangiriri statistical area

Rangiriri statistical area had a population of 1,833 at the 2018 New Zealand census, a decrease of 3 people (−0.2%) since the 2013 census, and an increase of 804 people (78.1%) since the 2006 census. There were 477 households, comprising 1,164 males and 669 females, giving a sex ratio of 1.74 males per female. The median age was 38.8 years (compared with 37.4 years nationally), with 291 people (15.9%) aged under 15 years, 372 (20.3%) aged 15 to 29, 942 (51.4%) aged 30 to 64, and 225 (12.3%) aged 65 or older.

Ethnicities were 73.5% European/Pākehā, 26.0% Māori, 7.0% Pacific peoples, 4.6% Asian, and 1.8% other ethnicities. People may identify with more than one ethnicity.

The percentage of people born overseas was 14.9, compared with 27.1% nationally.

Although some people chose not to answer the census's question about religious affiliation, 53.2% had no religion, 33.6% were Christian, 2.9% had Māori religious beliefs, 0.5% were Hindu, 1.0% were Muslim, 0.3% were Buddhist and 1.3% had other religions.

Of those at least 15 years old, 159 (10.3%) people had a bachelor's or higher degree, and 327 (21.2%) people had no formal qualifications. The median income was $22,500, compared with $31,800 nationally. 243 people (15.8%) earned over $70,000 compared to 17.2% nationally. The employment status of those at least 15 was that 690 (44.7%) people were employed full-time, 195 (12.6%) were part-time, and 114 (7.4%) were unemployed.

Features

Rangiriri Pā

Rangiriri Pā was a major defence site for Māori during the Invasion of the Waikato, as part of New Zealand Wars. Rangiriri Pā is legally protected as an historic reserve.

The pā site was restored as part of work on the Waikato Expressway by the New Zealand Transport Agency; the work was completed for the 150th anniversary of the battle in 2013.

The ramparts and trenches of the pā were also restored in subsequent years; Ngāti Naho and elders from other Waikato Tainui marae were welcomed to the site to view the restorations in April 2022.

Marae

Rangiriri has two marae belonging to the Waikato Tainui hapū of Ngāti Hine, Ngāti Naho, Ngāti Pou and Ngāti Taratikitiki:

 Horahora Marae and Te Whare i Whakaarohia meeting house
Maurea Marae and Ngā Tumutumu o Rauwhitu meeting house. Both are located on the western side of the Waikato River.

Rangiriri Bridge

To replace a punt, which had been operating since at least 1900, a timber truss bridge, with ferro-concrete piles, was started in 1915 and probably opened in 1917. It partly collapsed, but was strengthened to allow light traffic. Demolition of the old bridge cost $30,000.

About 1969 a single-lane replacement, designed by Murray-North Partners, was built downstream for £204,800 (National Roads Board £182,300, Raglan County Council £15,525, Waikato County Council £6975). The 2-cell H-section box girder is formed of 3 prestressed, post-tensioned segmented concrete flanged beams. The design was the first in this country to combine precast units into a continuous box girder.

In 2019 it carried about 1,640 vehicles a day on Glen Murray Rd.

Education

References

External links
 1859 photo "Looking across Onetea Stream at Rangiriri, with an eel weir (left foreground), and a thatched raupo hut (right)."
 Photo of first bridge

Waikato District
Populated places in Waikato
Populated places on the Waikato River